= Cowen Run =

Stream in Ohio, U.S.

Coordinates: 39°23′36″N 84°05′40″W

Cowen Run is a stream in the U.S. state of Ohio.

Cowen Run was named in honor of a local family. A variant name was "Cowens Run".
